Physical Chemistry Chemical Physics is a weekly peer-reviewed scientific journal publishing research and review articles on any aspect of physical chemistry, chemical physics, and biophysical chemistry. It is published by the Royal Society of Chemistry on behalf of eighteen participating societies. The editor-in-chief is David Rueda, (Imperial College London, UK).

The journal was established in 1999 as the results of a merger between Faraday Transactions and a number of other physical chemistry journals published by different societies.

Owner societies 
The journal is run by an Ownership Board, on which all the member societies have equal representation. The eighteen participating societies are:

 Canadian Society for Chemistry
 Deutsche Bunsen-Gesellschaft für Physikalische Chemie (Germany)
 Institute of Chemistry of Ireland
 Israel Chemical Society
 Kemian Seurat (Finland)
 Kemisk Forening (Denmark)
 Koninklijke Nederlandse Chemische Vereniging (Netherlands)
 Korean Chemical Society
 New Zealand Institute of Chemistry
 Norsk Kjemisk Selskap (Norway)
 Polskie Towarzystwo Chemiczne (Poland)
 Real Sociedad Española de Química (Spain)
 Royal Australian Chemical Institute
 Royal Society of Chemistry (United Kingdom)
 Società Chimica Italiana (Italy)
 Svenska Kemisamfundet (Sweden)
 Swiss Chemical Society
 Türkiye Kimya Dernegi (Turkey)

Article types 
The journal publishes the following types of articles
Research Papers, original scientific work that has not been published previously
Communications, original scientific work that has not been published previously and is of an urgent nature
Perspectives, review articles of interest to a broad readership which are commissioned by the editorial board
Comments, a medium for the discussion and exchange of scientific opinions, normally concerning material previously published in the journal

Abstracting and indexing 
The journal is abstracted and indexed in:

According to the Journal Citation Reports, the journal has a 2018 impact factor of 3.567.

See also 
 List of scientific journals in chemistry
 Annual Reports on the Progress of Chemistry Section C

References

External links 
 

Physical chemistry journals
Physics education in the United Kingdom
Publications established in 1999
Royal Society of Chemistry academic journals
Weekly journals
English-language journals
Chemical physics journals